António Araújo (28 September 1923 – 28 April 2001) was a former Portuguese footballer who played as forward. He only represented FC Porto during his professional career. He was also the top scorer in the 1947–48 season, being awarded the Portuguese Bola de Prata after scoring 36 goals throughout the course of the national championship.

International career
Araújo played 9 games and scored 5 goals for the Portugal national team. He scored 1 goal in his debut 14 April 1946 in a 2–1 victory against France in Lisboa. He played his last game against Spain in a 2–0 loss in Madrid, 21 March 1948.

References

External links

1923 births
People from Paredes, Portugal
2001 deaths
FC Porto players
Portuguese footballers
Portugal international footballers
Association football forwards
Sportspeople from Porto District